Olympic Hockey Centre may refer to:

Olympic Hockey Centre (Athens), used for the 2004 Summer Olympics
Riverbank Arena, formerly known as the Olympic Hockey Centre, which was used for the 2012 Summer Olympics in London
Olympic Hockey Centre (Rio de Janeiro), the hockey venue at the 2016 Summer Olympics